Kalinga Airlines was a private airline based in Calcutta, India. It was founded in 1947 by  aviator and politician Biju Patnaik, who was also the airline's chief pilot. The airline was nationalised and merged into Indian Airlines in 1953. It restarted operations as a non-scheduled charter operator in 1957 and flew passengers and cargo until 1972.

History 
In 1947, Biju Patnaik, who used to be a Royal Indian Air Force World War II Spitfire and DC-3 pilot, carried soldiers into Kashmir, landing the first platoon of troops in Srinagar. Kalinga Airlines' DC-3s were also used to drop supplies at North Eastern India. In 1953, the airline, along with other seven independent domestic airlines including Deccan Airways, Airways India, Bharat Airways, Himalayan Aviation, Indian National Airways, Air India and Air Services of India was nationalised and merged into the Indian Airlines Corporation.

Kalinga Airways restarted operations in December 1957 by the merger of five airlines, Assam Airways, Indamer Airways, Jamair, Kalinga and Darbhanga Aviations with a fleet of 15 DC-3s. Since May 1960, Kalinga specialised in supply dropping operations in the north-east regions of the country. Non-scheduled operations from Bombay to Dubai were also operated but were suspended in October 1962 to focus on supply dropping. The air-drop operations were taken over by the Indian Air Force in June 1967 and the airline reverted to passenger and cargo charters until February 1972.

Incidents and accidents 

 On 31 December 1951, the DC-3 carry three crew members struck trees on climb-out in limited visibility conditions.
 On 15 September 1952, a Kalinga Airlines Douglas Dakota cargo flight crashed in Wadi Halfa, Sudan killing three crew members aboard.
 On 10 April 1952, Douglas C-47A-25-DK carrying four crew members lost control when carrying out an emergency landing following an engine failure.
 On 30 August 1955, a Kalinga Airlines Douglas Dakota lifted off prematurely in Simra, Nepal in order to avoid hitting someone crossing the runway. Two of the three crew members aboard were killed.
 On 17 OCT 1965 Douglas C-47A-75-DL carry 8 people including 5 passengers crashed while dropping supplies in Mohanbari.

References

External links
Accident/Incident Report

Defunct airlines of India
Airlines established in 1946
Airlines disestablished in 1953
Memorials to Biju Patnaik
Companies based in Kolkata
Indian companies disestablished in 1953
Indian companies established in 1946